Compsolechia balia is a moth of the family Gelechiidae. It was described by Walsingham in 1910. It is found in Mexico (Guerrero, Morelos).

The wingspan is about 17 mm. The forewings are leaden brownish, thickly and profusely sprinkled with pale cinereous scales leaving a very ill-defined and
scarcely perceptible darker medio-costal spot, and a tornal shade diffused outward and upward, and a small spot above the middle of the termen. The hindwings are pale chocolate-brown.

References

Moths described in 1910
Compsolechia